Charles de Lorraine (c. 1525 – 26 December 1574), Duke of Chevreuse, was a French Cardinal, a member of the powerful House of Guise. He was known at first as the Cardinal of Guise, and then as the second Cardinal of Lorraine, after the death of his uncle, Jean, Cardinal of Lorraine (1550). He was the protector of François Rabelais and Pierre de Ronsard and founded Reims University. He is sometimes known as the Cardinal de Lorraine.

Biography
Born in 1525, Joinville, Haute-Marne, Charles of Guise was the son of Claude, Duke of Guise and his wife Antoinette de Bourbon. His older brother was François, Duke of Guise.  His sister Mary of Guise was wife of James V of Scotland and mother of Mary, Queen of Scots. He was made Archbishop of Reims in 1538, (the day after the coronation of king Henry II of France, at which he had officiated).

Cardinal
In a political move to draw the France closer to the papacy, Pope Paul III consecrated Charles as cardinal in July 1547. He became coadjutor for Bishop of Metz, his uncle Cardinal Jean de Lorraine, on 16 November 1547. Charles' uncle died on 10 May 1550 and he resigned and was succeeded as Administrator by Cardinal Robert de Lenoncourt.

The efforts of Charles to enforce his family's pretensions to the Countship of Provence, and his temporary assumption, with this object, of the title of Cardinal of Anjou were without success. He failed also when he attempted, in 1551, to dissuade Henry II from uniting the Duchy of Lorraine to France. Charles succeeded, however, in creating for his family interests certain political alliances that occasionally seemed in conflict with each other. He coquetted for instance on the one hand with the Lutheran princes of Germany, and on the other his interview (1558) with the Cardinal de Granvelle (at Péronne) initiated friendly relations between the Guises and the royal house of Spain.

In March 1558 de Pierceville wrote to Charles about building works and furnishing of the royal palaces, including the Louvre with tapestry and hangings of cloth of gold and cloth of silver. He wondered how the heraldry of the Cardinal's niece Mary, Queen of Scots and the Dauphin should be blazoned, and whether she had an open or imperial crown.
 
In 1562, he attended the Council of Trent. Louis de Saint-Gélais, Sieur de Lansac, Arnaud du Ferrier, president of the Parlement of Paris, and Guy de Faur de Pibrac, royal counsellor, who represented Charles IX at the council from 26 May 1562, towards the end of the year were joined by the Cardinal Lorraine. He was instructed to arrive at an understanding with the Germans, who proposed to reform the church in head and members and to authorize at once Communion under Both Kinds, prayers in the vernacular and the marriage of the clergy.

In the reform articles which he presented (2 January 1563), he was silent on the last point, but petitioned for the other two. Pius IV was indignant, and the cardinal denounced Rome as the source of all abuses. In the questions of precedence which arose between him and the Spanish ambassador, Count de Luna, Pius IV decided for the latter. However, in September 1563, on a visit to Rome, the cardinal, intent perhaps on securing the pope's assistance for the political ambitions of the Guises, professed opinions less decidedly Gallican. Moreover, when he learned that the French ambassadors, who had left the council, were dissatisfied because the papal legates had obtained from the council approval of a project for the "reformation of the princes", which the latter deemed contrary to the liberties of the Catholic Church in France (the "Gallican church"), he endeavoured, though without success, to bring about the return of the ambassadors, prevailed on the legates to withdraw the objectionable articles and strove to secure the immediate publication in France of the decrees of the council; this, however, was refused by Catherine de' Medici.

When in 1564, François de Montmorency, royal governor of Paris and his personal enemy, attempted to prevent Charles from entering the capital with an armed escort, the ensuing conflict and the precipitate flight of Charles gave rise to an outcry of derision which obliged him to retire to his diocese for two years. In 1570, he aroused the anger of Charles IX by inducing Duke Henri, the eldest of his nephews, to solicit the hand of Margaret of Valois, the king's sister. His share in the negotiations for the marriage between Charles IX and Elizabeth of Austria, and for that of Margaret of Valois with the prince of Navarre, granted him temporary favour. Shortly after the death of Charles IX, the cardinal appeared before his successor, Henry III, but died soon afterwards, at Avignon.

Legacy
As the Archbishop of Reims, Charles crowned successively Henry II, Francis II and Charles IX. He had a personal policy which was often at variance with that of the court. This policy rendered him at times an enigma to his contemporaries. The chronicler Pierre de L'Estoile accused Charles of great duplicity; Brantôme spoke of his "deeply stained soul, churchman though he was", accused him of skepticism and claimed to have heard him occasionally speak half approvingly of the Confession of Augsburg.  

From 1560, at least twenty-two libelous pamphlets were in circulation and fell into Charles' hands; they damaged his reputation with posterity as well as among his contemporaries. One of them, "La Guerre Cardinale" (1565), accuses him of seeking to restore to the Holy Roman Empire the three former prince-bishoprics of Metz, Toul and Verdun, in Lorraine, which had been conquered by Henry II. A discourse attributed to Théodore de Bèze (1566) denounced the pluralism of the cardinal in the matter of benefices. He established Reims University and served as François Rabelais and Pierre de Ronsard's guardian.

References

Sources

External links 

1524 births
1574 deaths
People from Haute-Marne
16th-century French cardinals
Reims University (1548–1793)
Archbishops of Reims
Bishops of Metz
Participants in the Council of Trent
Charles
French Ministers of Finance
16th-century peers of France
Court of Henry II of France
Court of Francis II of France
Court of Charles IX of France